Ida Dene Simmons  (born May 25, 1985) better known as Kim I-sak, is a German-born American singer, actress and radio personality based in South Korea. She was a member of South Korean R&B duo Isak N Jiyeon from 2002 to 2004. She left SM Entertainment in 2012. She has been a VJ for Pops in Seoul on Arirang TV and is now a DJ for "Kpoppin" on Arirang Radio.

Early life
Kim I-sak was born Ida Dene Simmons on May 25, 1985 in Frankfurt, Germany. She left Germany and moved to Kansas with her mother. She left Kansas when she was  years old to move to California and lived there until 1999. She emigrated to Korea later to learn about heritage and explore her music career in Korean pop music. Isak lived in a mostly white community with her mother.

Upon arrival in Korea, she attended the Korea Kent Foreign School, where her classmates and friends included Jessica Jung and Tiffany Young, the two future Korean American founding members of Girls' Generation. Tiffany lived with Isak initially when she moved to Seoul from Diamond Bar, California at the age of 15. Owing to their shared history and friendship, she has interviewed the duo mostly in English for Arirang's Pops in Seoul.

Isak N Jiyeon (2002–2004)

On September 3, 2002, Kim Isak debuted as a member of duo Isak N Jiyeon with release of album Tell Me Baby. The duo officially disbanded in 2004.

Discography

Filmography

Television dramas

Musical theater

Broadcasting activities
2008: Arirang TV Pops in Seoul VJ
2012: Arirang Radio Kpoppin DJ

Music video appearances
2007: Super Junior-T – Rokkugo

References

External links

 Kim Isak Cafe Daum

1985 births
Living people
South Korean women pop singers
South Korean female idols
South Korean radio presenters
German people of Korean descent
German expatriates in South Korea
21st-century South Korean singers
21st-century South Korean women singers
South Korean women radio presenters